Priatelia Zeme – SPZ (Slovak, translated to English as Friends of the Earth - SPZ) is a non-profit organisation protecting environment and nature in Slovakia and Europe since 1996. Priatelia Zeme – SPZ leads campaigns in the area of waste management and works on relating to waste, such as natural resources consumption, toxic substances use and disposal, effects of incinerators and packaging issues. They are independent from any government or political parties.

Scope of work 

 information and education (information campaigns, workshops, trainings, lectures...)
 campaigns to stop harmful activities
 help to municipalities and towns in reducing the amount of waste and development of separate waste collection
 projects to implement sustainable solutions (e.g. separation, composting, recycling, waste reduction)
 research, monitoring
 legislative changes

The most remarkable membership of Priatelia Zeme – SPZ represents their work in environmental organization Friends of Earth Slovakia, which is a member of  Friends of the Earth International (FoEI).

External links 
 http://www.priateliazeme.sk/spz

Environmental organisations based in Slovakia
Friends of the Earth
International environmental organizations